The 1995 San Francisco 49ers season was the franchise's 46th season in the National Football League (NFL) and their 50th overall.

Fresh from their victory in the Super Bowl the previous season, the 49ers lost cornerback Deion Sanders to Dallas and running back Ricky Watters to Philadelphia. Despite a mediocre 5–4 start, the 49ers went 11–5 and for the fourth straight time, they repeated as NFC West champions. The 49ers finished the season as the league's top scoring offense, averaging 28.6 points per game. They also finished number one in total defense, surrendering just 275 yards per game, along with being the top rushing defense and finishing second in points allowed. However, a stunning 27–17 loss to Brett Favre and the Green Bay Packers in the divisional round of the playoffs stripped the 49ers of their title defense and ended their season. This would be the first of three consecutive seasons that the Packers beat the 49ers in the playoffs. From 1990 to 2000, the 1995 49ers were the only NFC team to lose a divisional-round playoff game following a first-round bye.

Jerry Rice caught a career-high 122 receptions along with 1,848 receiving yards and 15 total touchdowns.

It was also the final season the 49ers wore their Super Bowl era uniforms.

Offseason

NFL Draft

Personnel

Staff

Roster

Regular season

Schedule

Game summaries

Week One at New Orleans 
The Niners began their Super Bowl defense on the road and raced to a 24–9 lead despite injury to Steve Young (accidentally kicked in the back of his neck) that necessitated play by Elvis Grbac for part of the first half. Two second-half Saints scores only closed the final to 24–22 Niners.

Week Four at Detroit Lions 
The Niners suffered their first defeat of the season in a 27–24 loss at the 0–3 Lions. The game lead tied or changed four times in the second half and a last-second Niners field goal attempt failed.

Week 11 vs. Dallas Cowboys 

In one of the biggest upsets of the year, the injury-depleted 49ers thrashed the Cowboys 38–20. Coming into this game, the Cowboys were the NFL's best team, with an 8–1 record. The 49ers, on the other hand, were sitting at 5–4 coming off disappointing losses to New Orleans and the expansion Panthers by a combined score of 24–14. Steve Young was out with injury and Elvis Grbac was the 49ers' starting quarterback, but he had consistently struggled, completing 55 passes for 570 yards but with four INTs. As a result, the Cowboys were 14-point favorites coming in.

On just the second play of the game, Grbac split two defenders and hit Jerry Rice for an 81-yard touchdown, putting the 49ers up 7–0. On the ensuing possession, Michael Irvin fumbled the ball and it was picked up by Merton Hanks for a 38-yard touchdown, putting the 49ers up by two touchdowns just 1 minute and 24 seconds into the game. On the Cowboys' ensuing drive, they again turned it over (Troy Aikman interception) that resulted in a 49ers field goal. The 49ers led 17–0 just 4 minutes and 58 seconds into the game. By halftime, the 49ers had an astonishing 31–7 lead and held on for the win, upsetting the red-hot Dallas Cowboys. The Cowboys turned the ball over four times in the game, while the 49ers had no turnovers.

Standings

Playoffs

NFC Divisional Playoff vs. Green Bay Packers 

The 49ers, who were almost 10-point favorites in the game, were upset by the visiting Green Bay Packers. Green Bay set the tone early with a Craig Newsome 31-yard fumble return for a touchdown, and never looked back. Even though Steve Young had more pass attempts, completions and passing yards than his counterpart 1995 League MVP Brett Favre, he failed to throw for a touchdown and finished with 2 interceptions. The 49ers had 4 turnovers in the game. This was the final game for 49ers wide receiver John Taylor.

Awards and records 
 Led NFL, Points Scored, 457 Points
 Jerry Rice, Franchise Record, Most Receiving Yards in One Game, 289 Receiving Yards (December 18, 1995)
 Jerry Rice, Franchise Record, Most Receptions in One Season, 122 Receptions
 Jerry Rice, NFL Record, Most Receiving Yards in One Season, 1,848 Receiving Yards
 Jerry Rice, Pro Bowl MVP

References 

 
 49ers Schedule on jt-sw.com

San Francisco 49ers
NFC West championship seasons
San Francisco 49ers seasons
San
1995 in San Francisco